Oenomaus curiosa is a species of butterfly of the family Lycaenidae. It is found in wet lowland forests in French Guiana, Peru and Brazil.

References

Butterflies described in 2008
Eumaeini